Monument Beach station is a former train station located on the Shore Road in Monument Beach, Massachusetts.

History

The station was originally built in 1875, three years after the Woods Hole branch of the Old Colony Railroad opened. The small depot was eventually replaced by a larger depot. This building was destroyed in 1906, when the village burned down. It was then replaced by the current structure, a building which still has its protective overhangs over the platforms, despite the fact that it is now a private residence.

References

External links

Bourne, Massachusetts
Old Colony Railroad Stations on Cape Cod
Stations along Old Colony Railroad lines
Former railway stations in Massachusetts